Cable One, Inc. is an American broadband communications provider. Under the Sparklight brand, it provides service to 24 states and 1.1 million residential and business customers. It is headquartered in Phoenix, Arizona, though it does not serve that metro area.

A former subsidiary of Graham Holdings Company, its name was changed in 1997 from Post-Newsweek Cable. 

In June 2015, Cable One, Inc. (NYSE Ticker: CABO) became an independent publicly traded company when Graham Holdings Company (NYSE Ticker: GHC) distributed 100% of CABO’s common stock to GHC shareholders in a tax-free transaction. GHC was formerly known as The Washington Post Company. 
 The CABO Information Statement sent to GHC shareholders was filed with the U.S. SEC on June 4, 2015 as Exhibit 99.1 to the Form 10-12B/A  To view a full list of the company’s SEC filings, see the SEC EDGAR website 

In summer 2019, Cable One re-branded itself as Sparklight, seeking to promote its internet services more than cable TV offerings. Equipment with Cable One branding is still used by longtime customers, but new customers get equipment with Sparklight branding. Cable One's original URL, cableone.net, redirects to sparklight.com.

Sparklight provides broadband service via cable (DOCSIS) through most of its footprint, and fiber-to-the-home in limited areas. 

Sparklight provides phone service plans such as Economy Phone, Standard Phone, and Elite Package with Starter Plan Plus.

Sparklight offers three cable TV plans: Economy Cable TV, Standard Cable TV, and Elite 100 Plus. Cable TV can also be accessed on Apple iPhone, Android, Windows, Roku, Xbox One, Xbox 360, and Nook through Sparklight's TV Everywhere service. Sparklight offers a Digital Value Pack which includes channels such as Red Zone, HBO, and Showtime as add-ons. Cable channels owned by Paramount Global that were owned by Viacom before the merger with CBS Corporation that formed Paramount are notably absent from Cable One's lineup after 2014 due to disagreements between Viacom and Cable One.

Its Cable TV service previously used a single cable connected directly to the TV to provide channels, but switched to using a cable box in early 2015 to provide channels. Cable One had promised superior image quality with their cable boxes, but some customers have reported that the cable boxes often display poor image quality.

In 2020, Cable One announced a new IPTV-based service, Sparklight TV, which was made available to many areas throughout 2021. Existing cable customers are not yet required to transfer to Sparklight TV, but cable through a cable box is no longer offered to new customers.

References

External links
 

Cable television companies of the United States
Companies based in Phoenix, Arizona
Telecommunications companies established in 1997
Internet service providers of the United States
Telecommunications companies of the United States
Companies listed on the New York Stock Exchange